Annick Lepetit (born 31 March 1958) is a French politician who was a member of the National Assembly of France from 2012-2017. She represented the city of Paris, and was a member of the Socialiste, radical, citoyen et divers gauche.

References

1958 births
Living people
Socialist Party (France) politicians
Women members of the National Assembly (France)
Deputies of the 12th National Assembly of the French Fifth Republic
Deputies of the 13th National Assembly of the French Fifth Republic
Deputies of the 14th National Assembly of the French Fifth Republic
21st-century French women politicians
Councillors of Paris
People from Boulogne-Billancourt
Politicians from Île-de-France